Trey Aubrey Lance (born May 9, 2000) is an American football quarterback for the San Francisco 49ers of the National Football League (NFL). He played college football at North Dakota State University, where he received the Walter Payton and Jerry Rice Awards as a freshman en route to winning the 2020 NCAA Division I Football Championship Game. Selected third overall by the 49ers in the 2021 NFL Draft, Lance spent most of his rookie season as a backup. Lance was named the starter in 2022, but his season was cut short by injury.

Early life and high school
Lance was born on May 9, 2000, in Marshall, Minnesota. He was trained mainly by his father, Carlton, a former cornerback for the Saskatchewan Roughriders of the Canadian Football League and the London Monarchs of the World League of American Football.

Lance played running back in youth football and first played at quarterback in middle school. He later attended Marshall High School, where he was viewed as the best quarterback prospect in Minnesota. Lance initially wanted to play at the University of Minnesota and had been ready to commit there after attending a recruiting event in February 2017. However, he was deemed a wide receiver or defensive back prospect by them and other Power Five schools. He eventually committed to North Dakota State in December 2017.

College career
Lance was redshirted for the 2018 season, but played in two games where he recorded two rushing touchdowns. He was named the starter in 2019 and led the Bison to the 2020 NCAA Division I Football Championship Game and was named the MVP in the 28–20 victory. Lance finished the season completing 192 of 287 passes for 2,786 yards, 28 touchdowns, and no interceptions, an NCAA record for most passing attempts in a season without an interception. He also ran 169 times for 1,100 yards and 14 touchdowns. For his performance that season, Lance won the Walter Payton Award as the FCS's most outstanding offensive player and the Jerry Rice Award as the FCS's best freshman.

Lance was set to start again in 2020 before the season was postponed due to the COVID-19 pandemic. His only game appearance that season was in a single game against Central Arkansas in October 2020. Lance threw for two touchdowns and ran for an additional two, while throwing the only interception of his college career. The Bison were scheduled to make up the rest of the season in early 2021, but Lance announced following the game that he would opt out to prepare for the 2021 NFL Draft.

College statistics

Professional career

Ahead of the 2021 NFL Draft, most analysts predicted Lance or Alabama quarterback Mac Jones would be taken third overall by the San Francisco 49ers, who traded up with the Miami Dolphins in exchange for their first-round picks in 2022 and 2023 and their third-round pick in 2022. The 49ers selected Lance, making him their first first-round quarterback since Alex Smith in 2005 and the second-highest drafted FCS player after fellow North Dakota State quarterback Carson Wentz. Considered a top quarterback prospect in the draft, Lance was one of five taken in the first round. He signed his four-year rookie contract, worth $34.1 million, on July 28, 2021.

2021

Lance began the 2021 season as the second-string quarterback behind incumbent starter Jimmy Garoppolo, but made his NFL debut in Week 1 against the Detroit Lions. He was used in one play during the first quarter, in which he contributed to the eventual 41–33 victory by throwing a five-yard touchdown pass to wide receiver Trent Sherfield. In Week 3 against the Green Bay Packers, Lance took the field for two plays and scored a rushing touchdown on the first. The game ended in a 30–28 defeat.

During Week 4 against the Seattle Seahawks, Lance saw his first significant playing time when he relieved an injured Garoppolo in the second half. He completed 9 of 18 passes for 157 yards and two touchdowns and rushed for 41 yards on seven carries, with the 49ers ultimately losing 28–21. Due to Garoppolo's injury, Lance was named the starter for the following week's game against the Arizona Cardinals. Lance completed 15 of 29 passes for 192 yards, rushed for 89 yards on 16 carries, and threw his first interception on the 49ers' opening drive to safety Budda Baker in the 17–10 defeat. Following the game, it was announced Lance suffered a sprained knee. The injury made Lance unavailable for the Week 7 matchup against the Indianapolis Colts, with Nate Sudfeld replacing him as the second option behind a returning Garoppolo. He returned as Garoppolo's backup during the next week's 33–22 victory over the Chicago Bears. Lance did not take field again until the 49ers' final drive against the Jacksonville Jaguars in Week 11. He rushed for seven yards before taking the victory formation to complete the 30–10 win.

Lance remained the second-string quarterback for the next five weeks until Garoppolo suffered a thumb injury in a 20–17 loss to the Tennessee Titans. Making his second start in Week 17 against the Houston Texans, Lance threw for 249 yards, two touchdowns, and an interception. The 49ers subsequently won 23–7, earning Lance his first career win. Lance's start marked his final appearance in 2021 after Garoppolo returned for the regular season finale against the Los Angeles Rams. He held a backup role during the 49ers' playoff run, which concluded with a defeat to the Rams in the NFC Championship Game. Following the season, Lance revealed he spent the year battling a right index finger injury he suffered in a preseason game against the Las Vegas Raiders.

2022

Lance was named the starter over Garoppolo for the 2022 season, but appeared in only two games before suffering a season-ending ankle injury against the Seattle Seahawks in Week 2. His only full game of the season was the opener against the Chicago Bears, completing 13 of 28 passes for 164 yards and an interception in a 19–10 loss. Lance had a second surgery on his ankle to remove hardware causing irritation.

NFL career statistics

Personal life
Lance is a Catholic and was a leader of his local Fellowship of Christian Athletes chapter in high school. His younger brother Bryce plays wide receiver at North Dakota State.

References

External links

San Francisco 49ers bio
North Dakota State Bison bio

2000 births
Living people
21st-century African-American sportspeople
African-American Christians
African-American players of American football
American football quarterbacks
Christians from Minnesota
North Dakota State Bison football players
People from Marshall, Minnesota
Players of American football from Minnesota
San Francisco 49ers players